Abdou Omar Abdou Ahmed (born 22 February 1989, in Suez) is an Egyptian freestyle wrestler. He qualified to compete in the 66 kg event at the 2012 Summer Olympics but forfeited his only match after showing up late to the event.

References

External links
 

1989 births
People from Suez
Egyptian male sport wrestlers
Olympic wrestlers of Egypt
Wrestlers at the 2012 Summer Olympics
Living people
21st-century Egyptian people